The 2022 European Junior Swimming Championships were held from 5 to 10 July 2022 in Otopeni, Romania. The Championships were for girls aged 14–17 and boys age 15–18.

Results

Boys

Girls

Mixed events

Medal table

Team Trophy
Results:

Diving
MEDALS AFTER 17/17 EVENTS

Boys

Girls

Mixed

References

External links 
Results
Results – Diving
Results book
Results book – Diving

European Junior Swimming Championships
European Junior Swimming Championships
International sports competitions hosted by Romania
European Junior Swimming Championships
European Junior Swimming Championships
Swimming
Sport in Ilfov County